Antipop is the sixth studio album by American rock band Primus. It was released on October 19, 1999, through Prawn Records and Interscope Records. Produced by the band, Tom Morello, Stewart Copeland, Tom Waits, Matt Stone, and Fred Durst, it was the final release by the band before their hiatus from 2000 to 2003. It was also the last album with drummer Brain. The album received mostly positive reviews from critics.

Production
The album features several well-known guest musicians and producers, including Tom Waits, James Hetfield (of Metallica), Jim Martin (former member of Faith No More), Fred Durst (of Limp Bizkit) and Tom Morello (of Rage Against the Machine).

The band has regarded the album's production as tense and uncomfortable, with the members of the band not getting along well with each other during recording.  Claypool has stated "Antipop was the most difficult record we ever made, because there was a lot of tension between the three of us, and there was some doubt at the label as to whether we knew what the hell we were doing anymore. But there was some great things to come out of it, like the tune we did with Tom Waits, 'Coattails of a Dead Man'. I love that song." It is said that the song is about Courtney Love - her husband (which in this case: Nirvana frontman Kurt Cobain) suffers from substance abuse and when he tries to find comfort from his wife, he commits suicide when receiving none. Instead of grieving, his wife finds fame and fortune from his death. None of the members from Primus have confirmed nor denied this.

After the release of the album the band went on a three-year hiatus from 2000 to 2003. Claypool said "We went on a hiatus, which is a fancy way of saying we just didn’t like being around each other and we wanted to break up but we didn’t have the balls to actually break up. I think we stopped before we totally shit our pants, but I think the closest we came was doing the Antipop record,"

While producing the song "Lacquer Head", Durst encouraged Primus to return to the more aggressive metal sound of their earlier albums Sailing the Seas of Cheese and Frizzle Fry for Antipop.

Reception

The album received mostly positive reviews from critics.  Stephen Thomas Erlewine of Allmusic gave the album a positive review, describing the album as "one of Primus' most ambitious and best efforts", noting that "some collaborations are among the best things Primus has ever recorded". Towards the end of the piece, Erlewine sums up his views by admitting that "they're not always successful, but no two songs sound the same [...] and even if it's not to your particular taste, it's hard not to respect this." A more negative review came Mike Wolf of CMJ New Music Monthly in November 1999. He wrote, "in the last couple of years since their last proper release, The Brown Album, the Bay-Area trio has had to watch as a bunch of other bands tagged as 'funk metal' dully thudded their way to superstardom. But bands like Korn and Limp Bizkit lack everything that sets Primus apart; an eccentric sense of humor, and the musical skill to bring weirdness to life. A pity then that on Antipop, Primus merely embraces the knucklehead approach of the Family Values crowd."

Legacy
The band themselves were not pleased with how the album turned out, their dissatisfaction being a contributing factor to their brief dissolution. Les Claypool said "We were reaching the end of our creative rope. The well was just dry, so we just started sucking mud".  In a 2015 interview, Claypool additionally characterized the album as "somewhat directionless", adding that "for the most part, it’s my least favorite Primus record. Regarding their association with the nu metal scene around this time, Claypool reflected in 2022, "a lot of these bands ended up touring with us. I always joke that we were the leapfrog band because you open for Primus and you become huge. I remember Interscope really wanting us to do Family Values and Ozzfest. And I was just not super comfortable in those worlds. I mean, we did them, and we made a lot of great friends from them, but it just didn’t feel like we fit."

Track listing
All lyrics written by Les Claypool, all music composed by Primus except tracks 2 & 8 by Primus & Tom Morello

 Around 38 seconds into the title track, the phrase "They're Here", from Poltergeist, can be heard right before the music starts playing.

Personnel 
Les Claypool – vocals, bass
Larry LaLonde – guitar, synthesizer (on "Eclectic Electric")
Brain – drums, percussion

Guest musicians
Tom Morello – lead guitar and production (on tracks 2, 8 and 11)
James Hetfield – rhythm guitar (on "Eclectic Electric")
Jim Martin – additional guitar (on "Eclectic Electric")
Martina Topley-Bird – backing vocals (on tracks 9 and 13)
Tom Waits – vocals, Chamberlin and production (on tracks 1 and 13)

Guest producers
Matt Stone – "Natural Joe"
Fred Durst – "Lacquer Head"
Stewart Copeland – "Dirty Drowning Man"

Charts

References

Primus (band) albums
1999 albums
Interscope Records albums
Prawn Song Records albums
Nu metal albums by American artists